Osmo Pekonen (2 April 1960 – 12 October 2022) was a Finnish mathematician, historian of science, and author. He was a docent of mathematics at the University of Helsinki and at the University of Jyväskylä, a docent of history of science at the University of Oulu, and a docent of history of civilization at the University of Lapland. He was the Book Reviews section editor of The Mathematical Intelligencer.

Personal life and death
Pekonen died suddenly in his sleep on 12 October 2022, at the age of 62, in Uzès, France during a bicycle tour.

Honours and distinctions 
Osmo Pekonen was a corresponding member of four French academies; these are: Académie des sciences, arts et belles-lettres de Caen (founded in 1652), Académie des sciences, belles-lettres et arts de Besançon et de Franche-Comté (founded in 1752), Académie d'Orléans (founded in 1809) and Académie européenne des sciences, des arts et des lettres (founded in 1979).

In 2012, he was awarded the Prix Chaix d'Est-Ange of the Académie des sciences morales et politiques in the field of history.

Bibliography

Doctoral theses 
 Contributions to and a survey on moduli spaces of differential geometric structures with applications in physics, PhD thesis, University of Jyväskylä, 1988
 La rencontre des religions autour du voyage de l'abbé Réginald Outhier en Suède en 1736-1737, D.Soc.Sci thesis, Rovaniemi: Lapland University Press, 2010

Monographies and edited volumes 
 Topological and Geometrical Methods in Field Theory, Osmo Pekonen & Jouko Mickelsson (eds.), Singapore: World Scientific, 1992
 Symbolien metsässä: Matemaattisia esseitä, Osmo Pekonen (ed.), Helsinki: Art House, 1992
 Ranskan tiede: Kuuluisia kouluja ja instituutioita, Helsinki: Art House, 1995
 Marian maa. Lasse Heikkilän elämä 1925–1961, Helsinki: SKS, 2002
 Osmo Pekonen & Lea Pulkkinen: Sosiaalinen pääoma ja tieto- ja viestintätekniikan kehitys, Helsinki: The Parliament of Finland, Committee for the Future, 2002
 Suomalaisen modernin lyriikan synty. Juhlakirja 75-vuotiaalle Lassi Nummelle, Osmo Pekonen (ed.), Kuopio: Snellman-instituutti, 2005
 Porrassalmi. Etelä-Savon kulttuurin vuosikirja (ten volumes, I-X), Jorma Julkunen, Jutta Julkunen & Osmo Pekonen et alia (eds.) Mikkeli: Savon Sotilasperinneyhdistys Porrassalmi ry, 2008-2017
 Lapin tuhat tarinaa. Anto Leikolan juhlakirja,Osmo Pekonen & Johan Stén (eds.), Ranua: Mäntykustannus, 2012
 Salaperäinen Venus, Ranua: Mäntykustannus, 2012
 Maupertuis en Laponie, with Anouchka Vasak, Paris: Hermann, 2014
 Maan muoto, with Marja Itkonen-Kaila, Tornio: Väylä, 2019
 Markkasen galaksit. Tapio Markkanen in memoriam, edited with Johan Stén, Helsinki: Ursa, 2019
 Valon aika, with Johan Stén, Helsinki: Art House, 2019
 Pohjan Tornio. Matkamiesten ääniä vuosisatain varrelta 1519-1919, Rovaniemi: Väylä, 2022

Essay collections 
 Danse macabre: Eurooppalaisen matkakirja, Jyväskylä: Atena, 1994
 Tuhat vuotta, Helsinki: WSOY, 1998
 Minä ja Dolly: Kolumneja, esseitä, runoja, Jyväskylä: Atena, 1999
 Oodi ilolle: Matkoja, maita, kaupunkeja, Turku: Enostone, 2010
 Joka paikan akateemikko, Turku: Enostone, 2012

Edited essay collections 
 Elämän puu, illustrated by Martti Ruokonen, Helsinki: WSOY, 1997
 Elämän värit, graphic design by Jussi Jäppinen, Jyväskylä: Kopijyvä, 2003
 Elämän vuodenajat, photographs by Seppo Nykänen, Jyväskylä: Minerva, 2005

Edited poem collections 
 Lasse Heikkilä: Balladi Ihantalasta. Runoja kesästä 1944, Osmo Pekonen (ed.), Helsinki & Jyväskylä: Kopijyvä/Minerva, 1999, 2007, 2016
 Charles Péguy: Chartres’n tie: Charles Péguy’n runoja, translated by Anna-Maija Raittila et alia, Osmo Pekonen (ed.), Jyväskylä: Minerva, 2003

Diaries 
 Saint-Malosta Sääksmäelle. Päiväkirjastani 2014-2015, Tampere: Enostone, 2015
 Minäkin Arkadiassa. Päiväkirjastani 2016-2017. Tampere: Enostone, 2017
 Unikukkia, ulpukoita. Päiväkirjastani 2018-2019. Rovaniemi: Väylä, 2019

Prose translations 
 Philippe Quéau: Lumetodellisuus (Le virtuel: Vertus et vertiges, 1993), translated into Finnish by Osmo Pekonen, Helsinki: Art House, 1995
 Alexei Sossinsky: Solmut: Erään matemaattisen teorian synty (Nœuds: Genèse d’une théorie mathématique, 1999), translated into Finnish by Osmo Pekonen, Helsinki: Art House, 2002
 Bo Lindberg: Latina ja Eurooppa (Europa och latinet, 1993), translated into Finnish by Osmo Pekonen, Jyväskylä: Atena, 1997 (2nd edition 2009)
 Peter Kravanja: Visconti, Proustin lukija (Visconti, lecteur de Proust, 2004), translated into Finnish by Osmo Pekonen, Jyväskylä & Helsinki: Minerva, 2006
 Mary Terrall: Maupertuis, maapallon muodon mittaaja (The Man Who Flattened the Earth. Maupertuis and the Sciences in the Enlightenment, 2002), translated into Finnish by Osmo Pekonen, Tornio: Väylä, 2015
 Émilie du Châtelet: Tutkielma onnesta (Discours sur le bonheur), translated into Finnish by  Osmo Pekonen, Kuopio: Hai, 2016
 Pierre Louis Moreau de Maupertuis: Fyysinen Venus (Vénus physique, 1745), translated into Finnish by Osmo Pekonen, Helsinki: Art House, 2017
 Roger Picard: Salonkien aika (Les salons littéraires et la société française 1610–1789, New York 1943), translated into Finnish by Osmo Pekonen & Juhani Sarkava, Helsinki: Art House, 2018
 Francis Godwin: Lento kuuhun (The Man in the Moone, London 1638), translated into Finnish by Osmo Pekonen, Helsinki: Basam Books, 2021

Translations of ancient poetry 
 Beowulf, translation into Finnish and commentaries by Osmo Pekonen & Clive Tolley, Helsinki: WSOY, 1999. Second edition: WSOY 2007
 Widsith: Anglosaksinen muinaisruno, translation into Finnish and commentaries by Osmo Pekonen & Clive Tolley, Jyväskylä: Minerva, 2004
 Waldere: Anglosaksinen muinaisruno, translation into Finnish and commentaries by Jonathan Himes, Osmo Pekonen & Clive Tolley, Jyväskylä: Minerva, 2005
 Gustav Philip Creutz: Atis ja Camilla (Atis och Camilla, 1761), translated into Finnish by Osmo Pekonen, Turku: Faros, 2019

Books with a preface by Osmo Pekonen 

 Ivar Ekeland: Paras mahdollisista maailmoista (Le meilleur des mondes possibles, 2000), translated into Finnish by Susanna Maaranen, Helsinki: Art House, 2004
 Réginald Outhier: Matka Pohjan perille (Journal d'un voyage au Nord, 1744), translated into Finnish by Marja Itkonen-Kaila, Rovaniemi: Väylä, 2011
 Jean-François Regnard: Retki Lappiin (Voyage de Laponie, 1731), translated into Finnish by Marja Itkonen-Kaila, Rovaniemi: Väylä, 2012
 Lassi Nummi: Le jardin de la vie, a selection of poems translated into French by Yves Avril, Orléans: Paradigme, 2015
 Auli Särkiö: Sarmatie (Sarmatia, 2011), translated into French by Yves Avril, Mont de Laval: Grand Tétras, 2015
 Eino Leino: "Doch ein Lied steht über allen...", a selection of poems translated into German by Manfred Stern, Hamburg: Verlag Dr. Kovač, 2017
 Voltaire: Mikromegas. Filosofinen kertomus (Micromégas: histoire philosophique, 1752), translated into Finnish by Marja Haapio, Helsinki: Basam Books, 2019

References

 Osmo Pekonen homepage

 Descartes Prize nominee citation
 Chaix d'Est Ange Prize

External links
  (not updated anymore)

1960 births
2022 deaths
Finnish mathematicians
21st-century Finnish writers
Academic staff of the University of Helsinki
International Mathematical Olympiad participants
People from Mikkeli